Sarkata Insaan (Urdu:) is a 1994 Pakistani science fiction horror action musical drama film directed, produced and visual effects created by Saeed Rizvi. The film stars Babra Sharif, Ghulam Mohiuddin and Qavi Khan in lead roles.

Plot

Cast 
Babra Sharif
Ghulam Mohiuddin
Qavi Khan
 Izhar Qazi
 Ajab Gul
 Sapna
 Talish
 Saeed Khan Rangeela
 Adeeb
 Munir Zareef
 Asif Khan
 Nayyar Sultana
 Gibran Haider Rizvi

Soundtrack

Release 
Sarkata Insaan was released on 22 April 1994.

References

External links 
 

1994 films
Pakistani science fiction horror films
1990s Urdu-language films
1990s science fiction horror films
Urdu-language Pakistani films